The  Milltown Hutterite Colony, located on the James River near Milltown, South Dakota, was listed on the National Register of Historic Places in 1982.  It was then the Dilger Ranch or Dilger Farm.  It was a Hutterite colony during 1886–1907.

The  listing included eight contributing buildings and one other contributing site.

References

National Register of Historic Places in South Dakota
Buildings and structures completed in 1916
Hutchinson County, South Dakota